The Jindo Gim clan is one of the Korean clans. Their Bon-gwan is in Jindo County, South Jeolla Province. According to the South Korean census held in 2000, the population of Jindo Gim clan was 1464. Their founder was  who was from Han dynasty but exiled himself to Jindo County, South Jeolla Province by ship to avoid Battle of Guandu in Three Kingdoms.

See also 
 Korean clan names of foreign origin

References

External links